The Broken Mask is a 1928 American silent drama film directed by James P. Hogan and starring Cullen Landis, Barbara Bedford and Wheeler Oakman. It was made by the independent Morris R. Schlank's production company. A review in Variety found "little to recommend", but The Film Daily was more positive.

Synopsis
Pertio, an Argentine dancer in New Orleans, falls in love with fellow performer Caricia. She persuades him to have his facial scars fixed by a plastic surgeon and the two team up both professionally and romantically. However the jealous doctor now desires Caricia and sets out to split them up.

Cast
 Cullen Landis as 	Pertio
 Barbara Bedford as Caricia
 William V. Mong as 	Santo Bendito
 Wheeler Oakman as	Dr. Gordon White
 James A. Marcus as Maurice Armato 
 Philippe De Lacy as 	Pertio - as a boy
 Ina Anson as 	Delores
 Nanci Price as 	Caricia - as a girl
 Pat Harmon as 	Revolutionary

References

Bibliography
 Connelly, Robert B. The Silents: Silent Feature Films, 1910-36, Volume 40, Issue 2. December Press, 1998.
 Munden, Kenneth White. The American Film Institute Catalog of Motion Pictures Produced in the United States, Part 1. University of California Press, 1997.

External links
 

1928 films
1928 drama films
1920s English-language films
American silent feature films
Silent American drama films
American black-and-white films
Films directed by James Patrick Hogan
Films set in New Orleans
1920s American films